SDB is a symbolic debugger for C programs.  It may be used to examine their files and to provide a controlled environment for their execution.
SDB was first introduced in UNIX/32V.  The authors(s) of the original version are unknown, but a second version was created from scratch in 1988 by Brian Russell and David Weatherford.

Technical details

SDB is a minimal debugger, that can only debug C programs compiled in COFF format with debug options.  The later version (1988) was capable of reading DWARF debugging information.

Tutorials
SCO OpenServer(TM) Programming Tools Guide - SDB

Debuggers